Servet Pëllumbi (born December 12, 1936 in Korçë) is an Albanian politician.  He served as Chairman of the Assembly of the Republic of Albania from 30 April, 2002 until 3 September, 2005. Pëllumbi is lecturer in Political Academy of the Socialist Party of Albania.

See also
 Political Academy of the Socialist Party of Albania

References

1936 births
Living people
People from Korçë
Socialist Party of Albania politicians
Speakers of the Parliament of Albania
Members of the Parliament of Albania